Bill Looby (November 20, 1931 in St. Louis, Missouri – December 9, 1998 in St. Louis) was an American soccer forward who spent his entire career in the St. Louis Leagues.  He was a member of the U.S. Olympic soccer team at the 1956 Summer Olympics and earned eight caps, scoring six goals, with the United States men's national soccer team between 1954 and 1959. He was a member of the 1959 Bronze medal Pan American Team scoring 6 goals in those games as well. Looby is a member of the Saint Louis Soccer Hall of Fame and the National Soccer Hall of Fame.

Professional
Looby played forward both professionally and for the U.S. national team.  In the fall of 1949, he played for Dohle's of the St. Louis Major League.  In January 1950, the team was briefly renamed Selby's before becoming Lenneman's as the team's sponsorship changed.  In April 1950, Looby signed with Zenthoefer Furs in the St. Louis Municipal League.  In the fall of 1950, he joined the St. Louis Raiders which won the National Amateur Cup in 1952.  After that victory, Tom Kutis, owner of the Kutis Funeral Home, began to sponsor the team.  Looby played the next 2 seasons with the Grapette Soccer team, rejoining the team, now known as St. Louis Kutis in 1954 where he played until 1970. In 1954, he led the Municipal League in scoring.  Looby played in Kutis’ six consecutive National Amateur Cup championships (1956–1961).  He also scored goals in both games of the 1957 National Challenge Cup championship over New York Hakoah.  In 1958, the U.S. Soccer Football Association used the Kutis team as the U.S. national team in two world cup qualifying games against Canada.  Another memorable event for Looby as a Kutis team member took place on May 5, 1955, when Kutis defeated 1. FC Nürnberg, 3–2.  The Nürnberg team featured four players from the 1954 West German  World Cup championship team.

National team
In 1954 Looby became a member of the US National Team.  In 1956, he played for the U.S. Olympic team at the 1956 Summer Olympics. He also played in several games in the US team's tour of the Orient leading up to the Olympic games in Australia.  Looby earned eight caps with the senior national team, scoring six goals. He earned his first cap and scored his first goal for the US in a 1954 World Cup qualifier against Mexico.  He played his last game with the national team in 1959.  In 1959, Looby was a member of the U.S. Pan American team which took the bronze medal.  He scored six goals in that tournament.  Looby was also a member of the 1960 US Olympic team, a finalist for the 1952 US Olympic team, and an alternate for the 1964 Olympic team.

Looby was inducted into the St. Louis Soccer Hall of Fame in 1984 and the National Soccer Hall of Fame in 2001.

References

External links
 
 
 
 
 

1931 births
1998 deaths
American soccer players
Association football forwards
Footballers at the 1956 Summer Olympics
Footballers at the 1959 Pan American Games
National Soccer Hall of Fame members
Olympic soccer players of the United States
Pan American Games bronze medalists for the United States
Pan American Games medalists in football
Soccer players from St. Louis
St. Louis Kutis players
St. Louis Raiders players
United States men's international soccer players
Zenthoefer Furs players
Medalists at the 1959 Pan American Games